Valeč may refer to places in the Czech Republic:

Valeč (Karlovy Vary District), a municipality and village
Valeč (Třebíč District), a municipality and village